ZP De Villiers Theart (born 27 May 1975) is a South African singer, songwriter and the former lead vocalist for the British power metal band DragonForce and American rock band Skid Row. Theart was also hired by Riot Games for the voice of Karthus in the songs "Deathfire Grasp" and "Last Whisper" by the metal band Pentakill.

Early life and first bands
Theart was born on 27 May 1975 in Clanwilliam, Western Cape, South Africa, and grew up in Hazyview in the Eastern Transvaal (now the Mpumalanga province), on a banana and Lychee farm, and was raised there by his mother. His older brother lived with him as well. He has stated that according to his mother, at the age of three years, he began to hold a tablespoon up to his mouth, pretending that it was a microphone, and singing to whatever was on the radio. He has stated that in his early childhood, he listened to artists such as Gé Korsten, Carika Keuzenkamp and Rina Hugo, but his older brother began to introduce him to other music cassette tapes that he had gotten from high school, some of them being A-ha, Alphaville, Depeche Mode and then one day, Bon Jovi's Slippery When Wet, which is a favorite of Theart's. "I loved the way he pronounced the words and the way he wrote", he said in an interview. He then began to discover other favorite bands such as Mötley Crüe, Def Leppard, Iron Maiden, Metallica, and Skid Row. He stated that his two favorites were Bon Jovi and Skid Row. During his teen years, Theart fronted and played in many bands. Not all of them are known but one was a Pretoria-based band called Santaria which was active during the late eighties and early nineties. Some of the members were the current drummer of Cold Hand Chemistry, Robert Fick, ex-Strider guitarist Pierre Goosen, and Stefan Steyn. After Theart graduated high school, he moved away to London, England, seeking global popularity. In the late 1990s, Theart fronted a garage/hard rock band called Easy Voodoo. They released a demo in 1999 but shortly after its release, Theart left the band. In the early 2000s Theart worked as a shuttle bus driver for Edexcel, between Stewart House and Blundell Street.

DragonForce

In late 1999, Theart began to put out advertisements at Thin Ice Studios, which were eventually responded to by former Demoniac guitarists Herman Li and Sam Totman. Together, they formed a band called DragonHeart, but the name was later changed to DragonForce. The band recorded a demo in 2000 and the album Valley of the Damned in 2003 on Noise Records. The following year, another album Sonic Firestorm was released on the same label and a world tour followed. In 2005, Dragonforce signed to Roadrunner Records, and Inhuman Rampage was released in 2006, eventually going gold. In 2008, Theart's fourth and final album with the band, Ultra Beatdown, was released, and in 2009, another world tour followed. In 2010, Valley of the Damned and Sonic Firestorm were re-released with bonus DVDs, featuring live footage, interviews, and other things. Later that year, Theart left the band due to "insurmountable differences of musical opinion". He has since stated that he does not regret his decision to leave.

Tank
Theart served as the touring vocalist for Tank in 2013, becoming an official member the following year. His only studio project with the band was Valley of Tears in 2015, being replaced with David Readman shortly after due to his transition into Skid Row.

Skid Row
On 13 February 2016 Theart premiered as the touring vocalist for Skid Row. The band continued to tour throughout 2016 with Theart as their frontman. Following a year of touring, on 14 January 2017, he was announced as their official lead vocalist.
However, on March 23 2022, the band announced they had parted ways with the singer and named a replacement without giving many details about the separation.

I Am I
After leaving DragonForce, Theart founded his own band, I Am I, in which he sings lead vocals. The band has so far released one studio album, Event Horizon, which has been released on a USB format and CD.

Other projects
Before DragonForce, Theart was also briefly involved with hard rock band Easy Voodoo. During the first few years since DragonForce's inception, Theart and his bandmate Sam Totman recorded a demo under the name Shadow Warriors, and Theart recorded the vocals for the 2001 two track Power Quest demo album.

Discography

DragonForce

Valley of the Damned (2003)
Sonic Firestorm (2004)
Inhuman Rampage (2006)
Ultra Beatdown (2008)
Twilight Dementia (2010)
Killer Elite: the Hits, the Highs, the Vids (2016)
I AM I

Event Horizon (2012)
You're the Voice (2012) (single)
See You Again (2013) (single)
Pentakill
Smite and Ignite (2015) (Tracks "Deathfire Grasp" and "Last Whisper")
Tank

Valley of Tears (2015)

References

External links

1975 births
DragonForce members
Living people
White South African people
Afrikaner people
21st-century South African male singers
Heavy metal singers
Tank (band) members
Skid Row (American band) members